The 2000 United States presidential election in Ohio took place on November 7, 2000, and was part of the 2000 United States presidential election. Voters chose 21 representatives, or electors to the Electoral College, who voted for president and vice president.

Ohio was won by Governor George W. Bush by a 3.51% margin of victory. Prior to the election, most news organizations considered Ohio a swing state. Bush won a 3.51 point victory. Bush performed strongly in most parts of rural Ohio. Gore kept the race close by running up big margins in Cuyahoga County, home of Cleveland. Gore also won the traditional working-class counties of Mahoning, Portage, and Trumbull counties. Gore only narrowly took Franklin County, home of Columbus, which at the time was a swing county but is now seen as reliably Democratic, having given Democratic nominees a majority of the vote in every election since. , this was the last presidential election in Ohio where the Democrat won Clark County, home of Springfield. Ohio kept its streak of voting for the winner in every election since 1964, but this was the first election since 1960 that Ohio did not back the winner of the overall popular vote.
Ohio was one of 9 states that voted for Bill Clinton twice that George W. Bush managed to flip.

Bush became the first Republican to win the White House without carrying Erie County and Franklin County since Benjamin Harrison in 1888.

Results
Official state results from the Ohio Secretary of State are as follows:

Results by county

Counties that flipped from Democratic to Republican
Carroll (Largest city: Carrollton)
Columbiana (Largest city: Salem)
Gallia (Largest city: Gallipolis)
Guernsey (Largest city: Cambridge)
Harrison (Largest city: Cadiz)
Hocking (Largest city: Logan)
Huron (Largest city: Norwalk)
Jackson (Largest city: Jackson)
Lake (Largest city: Mentor)
Lawrence (Largest city: Ironton)
Meigs (Largest city: Middleport)
Noble (Largest city: Caldwell)
Ottawa (Largest city: Port Clinton)
Perry (Largest city: New Lexington)
Pike (Largest city: Waverly)
Ross (Largest city: Chillicothe)
Sandusky (Largest city: Fremont)
Scioto (Largest city: Portsmouth)
Seneca (Largest city: Tiffin)
Stark (Largest city: Canton)
Tuscarawas (Largest city: New Philadelphia)
Vinton (Largest city: McArthur)
Wood (Largest city: Bowling Green)

By congressional district
Bush won 11 of 19 congressional districts. Both candidates won two districts held by the other party.

See also
 United States presidential elections in Ohio
 Presidency of George W. Bush

References

Ohio
2000
Presidential